Mylläri, meaning "miller" in Finnish, may refer to:

Mylläri (surname)
Mylläri convention in the game of bridge
Mylläri, a 2011 EP of Finnish band Circle